Burchardia congesta  is a perennial herb in the family Colchicaceae, and is native to  Western Australia.

Taxonomy
Burchardia congesta was first described by John Lindley in 1840.  The name has not been revised, and there are no synonyms.

Origin of name
The genus Burchardia is named for German botanist Johann Heinrich Burckhardt. The species name congesta is Latin for "piled up, crowded".

References

External links

Australasian Virtual Herbarium - Occurrence data for Burchardia congesta

congesta
Monocots of Australia
Angiosperms of Western Australia
Root vegetables
Plants described in 1840
Taxa named by John Lindley